Cleverly is a surname. Notable people with the name include:
 Barbara Cleverly (born 1940), British author of detective fiction
 Charles St George Cleverly (1819–1897), second Surveyor General in Hong Kong
 Harry Cleverly (1912–1968), American ice hockey and baseball coach at Boston University
 James Cleverly (born 1969), British Conservative Member of Parliament
 Marcus Cleverly  (born 1981), Danish handballer 
 Nathan Cleverly (born 1987), Welsh boxer
 Sir Osmund Somers Cleverly (1891–1966), Principal Private Secretary to the British Prime Minister
 Rhian Cleverly (born 1995), Welsh footballer

See also
 Cleverley, surname with a similar spelling
 Cleverly estate, a Peabody Trust housing estate in Shepherd's Bush, London, completed in 1928
 Cleverly Street, Hong Kong

English-language surnames